The 2000 Brownlow Medal was the 73rd year the award was presented to the player adjudged the fairest and best player during the Australian Football League (AFL) home-and-away season. Shane Woewodin of the Melbourne Football Club won the medal by polling twenty-four votes during the 2000 AFL season.

The Essendon Football Club set a record for the highest number of votes collected as a team, with 116 out of a possible 132 votes. The club polled at least one vote in every game, including all six votes in 14 games.

Leading vote-getters

References 

Brownlow Medal
2000
Brownlow Medal